Helene von Taussig (1879-1942) was an Austrian painter.

Biography
von Taussig was born on 10 May 1879 in Vienna, Austria. Born into a prominent Jewish family, she was the fifth of 12 children. In 1910 she traveled with fellow artist Emma Schlangenhausen to Oschwand, Switzerland where they studied painting with Cuno Amiet. From 1911 through 1914 von Taussig studied at the Académie Ranson in Paris. During World War I she served the in the Red Cross on the Isonzo front.

In 1923 von Taussig converted to Catholicism.

Because of her Jewish ancestry von Taussig was deported to the Izbica Ghetto in Poland in 1942 where she died in on 21 April 1942.

Legacy

In 2012 many of her paintings were returned to her heirs by the Salzburg Museum as part of the Federal Act on the Restitution of Artworks from Austrian Federal Museums and Collections. The heirs subsequently sold eleven of the nineteen paintings back to the Salzburg Museum.
  
von Taussig is memorialized by a stolperstein in Kirchenplatz, Anif, which was installed in 2014.

Her work was included in the 2019 exhibition City Of Women: Female artists in Vienna from 1900 to 1938 at the Österreichische Galerie Belvedere.

Gallery

References

External links

Further reading 
 The restitution case of Helene von Taussig (1879-1942)

 
1879 births
1942 deaths
20th-century Austrian women artists
Artists from Vienna